Söldner-X: Himmelsstürmer is a 2007 scrolling shooter video game developed by German company SideQuest Studios and published by Eastasiasoft. The game was initially released physically for Microsoft Windows on December 14, 2007, before coming to the PlayStation 3 via the PlayStation Network in December 2008.

Gameplay 

Söldner-X is a traditional 2D shoot 'em up game with parallax scrolling, 720p high-definition graphics, weather effects and a rich weapon upgrade system.

Development and release

Name 
The title of the game is Söldner-X: Himmelsstürmer, a German expression.

Söldner-X translates as Mercenary-X.
Himmelsstürmer - Someone who's set to defy the impossible, easily overcoming true-life obstacles. Literally, Himmelsstürmer would mean "somebody who attacks/conquers the sky, alternatively "storms into the sky". An accepted translation of Himmelsstürmer is "Romantic Idealist".

Reception 

Review media aggregator website Metacritic scored the game at 63%, based on 11 reviews, indicating "Mixed or average reviews". Jeff Haynes of IGN awarded the game an 8.0 calling it "impressive".

Sequel 
A sequel titled Söldner-X 2: Final Prototype released exclusively for the PlayStation 3 (as a downloadable game), appeared in May 2010. The game features seven levels with a further three available as downloadable content. The sequel removes the weapon charging mechanic and limited ammo from the original game, resulting in a more traditional gameplay experience. It was also released in March 2015 for the PlayStation Vita. An enhanced version of the game for the PlayStation 4, titled Söldner-X 2: Final Prototype Definitive Edition was released in November 2020.

References

External links 
 

2007 video games
PlayStation 3 games
PlayStation Network games
Horizontally scrolling shooters
Windows games
Video games developed in Germany
Video games scored by Rafael Dyll
Video games with 2.5D graphics
PlayStation Vita games